Swarm is an American psychological horror thriller television series created by Donald Glover and Janine Nabers. The series follows Dre (Dominique Fishback), a young woman whose obsession with a pop star takes a dark turn.

Swarm debuted on March 17, 2023 on Amazon Prime Video. It received positive reviews from critics, who praised the screenplay, direction, cinematography, soundtrack, and balance between its bright, vivid aesthetic and its elements of psychological horror. Fishback's performance in the series has received widespread acclaim, while the performances of Bailey and Eilish have also received popular praise.

Synopsis
The series tells the story of Dre, a young woman who is obsessed with a fictional pop star (whose oeuvre and aesthetic are very similar to that of American singer Beyoncé), with a fanbase known as "The Swarm" (with Beyoncé’s fan base also known as the "Bey Hive"). The show is a dive into Dre's life, her fandom, and how it takes her to dark, unexpected places.

Cast

Main 
 Dominique Fishback as Andrea “Dre” Greene, a young woman whose obsession with Ni'Jah, a world-famous popstar, leads her on a dark and murderous path across the United States.

Recurring 
 Chloe Bailey as Marissa "Ris" Jackson, Dre's foster sister and roommate 
 Nirine S. Brown as Ni'Jah, a pop star whom Dre idolizes
 Karen Rodriguez as Erica, Marissa's friend and boss

Guest 
 Damson Idris as Khalid, Marissa's boyfriend ("Stung")
 Rory Culkin as a man Dre meets at the club and goes home with. ("Stung")
 Atkins Estimond as Reggie, a man Dre is hunting who tweeted negative stuff about Marissa and Ni’Jah ("Honey")
 X Mayo as Cheeks ("Honey")
 Paris Jackson as Hailey, a stripper who has an abusive boyfriend and who goes by the name Halsey ("Honey")
 Byron Bowers as George, a sound man whom Dre uses to get closer to Ni'Jah ("Taste")
 Kate Lyn Sheil as Cricket, a girl who offers Dre a place to stay during Bonnaroo. ("Running Scared")
 Billie Eilish as Eva, a women empowerment cult leader that takes Dre under her wing ("Running Scared")
 Victoria Blade as Salem ("Running Scared")
 Rickey Thompson as Kenny ("Girl, Bye")
 Leon as Harris ("Girl, Bye")
 Heather Simms as Loretta Greene, a detective who has started to piece together that these killings have a common thread, Ni'Jah. ("Fallin' Through The Cracks")
 Kiersey Clemons as Rashida, a college student whom Dre falls in love with ("Only God Makes Happy Endings")
 Cree Summer as Rashida's mother ("Only God Makes Happy Endings")
 Norm Lewis as Rashida's father ("Only God Makes Happy Endings")

Episodes

Production

Development
In February 2021, Donald Glover signed an overall deal with Amazon Studios. One of the projects in development included Hive, which would revolve around a figure inspired by Beyoncé, with Janine Nabers acting as co-creator and showrunner. Glover is also credited as creator and executive producer, and directed the first episode.

Writing
Glover compared the series to "post-truth Piano Teacher mixed with The King of Comedy". Glover and Nabers wanted to create an anti-hero story, using Tony Soprano and Don Draper as inspiration.

Malia Obama is among the writers of the series. Nabers said "We really wanted to give her the opportunity to get her feet wet in TV and see if this is something she wants to continue doing."

Casting
In April 2022, Dominique Fishback was announced as the lead actress of the series, also joining as a producer. Glover contacted Fishback to play the role of the lead's sister. Fishback convinced Glover to give her the lead role.

The series also stars Chloe Bailey as Dre's sister, Marissa and Damson Idris as Marissa's boyfriend.

Release
Swarm premiered at the 2023 South by Southwest Film Festival on March 10, 2023. All seven episodes were released on Prime Video on March 17, 2023.

Reception

Swarm has received positive reviews from critics, with the performance of Dominique Fishback receiving ubiquitous praise. On the review aggregator website Rotten Tomatoes, Swarm holds an approval rating of 84%, based on 35 critic reviews with an average rating of 7.6/10. The site's critical consensus reads: "Swarm can be as unpleasant as a hornet sting, but Dominique Fishback's ferocious performance and the creators' bold creative swings add up to a truly subversive take on toxic fandom." Metacritic, which uses a weighted average, has assigned the series a score of 66 out of 100 based on 22 critics, indicating "generally favorable reviews".

At RogerEbert.com, Nick Allen gave the series 3.5 out of 4 stars, calling it a "blood-splattered pop culture provocation" that "plays out like a funhouse mirror reflection of very real, however bizarre, trending topics of the recent past." He also wrote that Donald Glover's directorial pilot episode was "terrific" and that "the series' satire is all the more heartbreaking and compulsively watchable because of [Dominique] Fishback's dedication to every facet of Dre."

References

External links 
 

2020s American drama television series
2020s American horror television series
English-language television shows
Upcoming drama television series
Amazon Prime Video original programming
Television series by Amazon Studios